Hercules' Club may refer to: 

Hercules' Club (amulet), a Roman and Migration era artefact type.

Plants
Aralia spinosa (also called angelica tree, devil's walking stick, prickly ash) 
Zanthoxylum clava-herculis (also called pepperwood, Southern prickly ash)

Rock formation
Hercules' Club or Hercules' Bludgeon, a 25-metre-high limestone column at Ojców National Park, Poland.